C-REAL was a five-member South Korean girl group formed by NAP Entertainment in 2011. They debuted with their song No No No No No on October 12, 2011. Their group name was taken from the first letter of each member's name. They are dubbed as the "5-IU Idols" because they are produced by Choi Kab Won, who also produced IU.

History

2011: Debut with Round 1
C-REAL released their debut EP, Round 1, with the title track "No No No No No" produced by Brave Brothers, on October 12, 2011.

In November 2011, C-REAL started their Japanese promotions through a route different from their peers. Following their debut showcase, the girls put their future contract up for auction, signing with the label that provides the best conditions. Unlike other groups who sign with an agency before heading over, the girls will be using the 'posting system', a method favored by professional baseball players. Since their debut in October, the girls were nicknamed the 5-IU idols, which had generated interest overseas.

On December 6, 2011, the group participated in the OST of Flower Boy Ramen Shop with a song is entitled "Just Say It".

2012: Love Diary, "Sorry But I" and "Danger Girl"
In March 2012 the group released their second EP, Love Diary, with its title track "Joma Joma". Later that month the group, participated in Hope Concert for Multicultural Families, with other idols such as FT Island, ZE:A and Stellar.

C-REAL released their first digital single, "Sorry But I", on May 16, 2012. It was the group's first release to chart on Gaon Digital Chart, debuting at 90. Their second digital single "Danger Girl was released on December 14, 2012.

2013: Line-up changes & Possible disbandment
In March 2013, N.A.P announced that the group would be going on indefinite hiatus due to the members returning to school. As the group has been inactive since September 2014, many fans speculate that the group has disbanded, however no official statement has been made.

Discography

Extended play

Singles

Soundtrack appearances

References

South Korean girl groups
Musical groups established in 2011
2011 establishments in South Korea
South Korean dance music groups
K-pop music groups
Musical groups disestablished in 2014
2014 disestablishments in South Korea